is the second studio album by the Japanese rock band Mucc, released on September 6, 2002. It is the first album to be released by their sublabel Shu, under Danger Crue. Its cover was illustrated by manga artist Junji Ito. The first pressing of the album includes two discs; the second containing two songs and a 24-minute comment on the album. The album sold out quickly, and the following month a reissue was released on October 18, this one without the second disc but with the first one enhanced with the music video for the song "Zetsubō". On August 17, 2004, a second reissue was released, including both discs from the first release plus a bonus track on the first one. The 2004 reissue reached number 48 on the Oricon chart.

Track listing

Note
 A re-recording of "Mae e" was featured on their 2014 single ENDER ENDER.
 2 re-recording of "Sekai no Owari" were featured on their 2017 live limited single Ieji.
 The album was re-recorded and remastered as a self-cover album titled Sin Homura Uta released on August 9, 2017.

References 

Mucc albums
2005 albums